This is a list of the main career statistics of professional Czech tennis player Karolína Muchová. Her first breakthrough was at the US Open in 2018, when she as qualifier made her Grand Slam debut and defeated former world No. 1 Garbiñe Muguruza in order to reach third-round. She has won one WTA Tour title at the Korea Open, after defeating Magda Linette in straight-sets.  At the Grand Slams, she reached semifinal of the 2021 Australian Open, after defeating world No. 1 Ashleigh Barty. Along with that, she has two back-to-back quarterfinals at Wimbledon Championships (2019 and 2021).

Performance timeline

Only main-draw results in WTA Tour, Grand Slam, Fed Cup/Billie Jean King Cup and Olympic Games are included in win–loss records.

Singles
Current after the 2023 Indian Wells Open.

Doubles
Current after the 2023 Qatar Open.

WTA career finals

Singles: 2 (1 title, 1 runner-up)

Note: Tournaments sourced from official WTA archives

ITF Circuit finals

Singles: 10 (2 titles, 8 runner–ups)

Doubles: 3 (1 title, 2 runner–ups)

Note: Tournaments sourced from official ITF archives

WTA Tour career earnings
Current after the 2023 Qatar Open.
{|cellpadding=3 cellspacing=0 border=1 style=border:#aaa;solid:1px;border-collapse:collapse;text-align:center;
|-style=background:#eee;font-weight:bold
|width="90"|Year
|width="100"|Grand Slam <br/ > singles titles|width="100"|WTA <br/ > singles titles
|width="100"|Total <br/ > singles titles
|width="120"|Earnings ($)
|width="100"|Money list rank
|-
|2014
|0
|0
|0
|align=right|3,700
|800
|-
|2015
|0
|0
|0
| align="right" |7,470
|596
|-
|2016
|0
|0
|0
| align="right" |26,507
|326
|-
|2017
|0
|0
|0
| align="right" |19,788
|407
|-
|2018
|0
|0
|0
| align="right" |197,041
| 161
|-
|2019
|0
|1
|1
| align="right" |1,155,524
|36
|-
|2020
|0
|0
|0
| align="right" |493,478
|42
|-
|2021
|0
|0
|0
| align="right" |1,351,039
|21
|-
|2022
|0
|0
|0
|align=right|443,949
|112
|-
|2023
|0
|0
|0
|align=right|116,903
|74
|- style="font-weight:bold"
|Career
|0
|1
|1
| align="right" |3,835,685
|174
|}

Career Grand Slam statistics

Grand Slam seedings
The tournaments won by Muchová are in boldface, and advanced into finals by Muchová are in italics.

Best Grand Slam results details
Grand Slam winners are in boldface', and runner–ups are in italics.''

Record against other players

No. 1 wins

Record against top 10 players

 She has a 7–10 record against players who were, at the time the match was played, ranked in the top 10.

Notes

References

Muchová, Karolína